Civil parishes in Waverley are depicted and alphabetically are:

Notes and references
Notes

References

Local government in Surrey

de:Waverley (Surrey)
nl:Waverley (Surrey)
no:Waverley (Surrey)